National Lampoon's Gold Diggers (also known as National Lampoon's Lady Killers) is a 2003 American black comedy film written and directed by Gary Preisler. It features two friends (Will Friedle and Chris Owen) who marry two elderly sisters (Louise Lasser and Renée Taylor) so they can inherit their fortunes when they die.

Plot

Two dimwitted friends try to get rich through small crimes, including an unsuccessful attempt to mug two elderly women. 
They agree to get married, the women scheme to kill them off and collect on a life insurance policy, the men think the elderly women will die and leave them a big inheritance.

Cast

Reception

Box office
The film was considered a dismal failure, with a theatrical run of only 1 week, and earning less than $400,000 as opening weekend receipts (less than $400 per theater).

Critical response 
The film received overwhelmingly negative reviews. On review aggregator website Rotten Tomatoes, with 44 reviews, the film has a rare approval rating of 0%meaning no favorable reviews whatsoeverreceiving an average rating of 1.8/10. The film was included on the site's Worst of the Worst list of movies of the decade (2000–09).
According to film review website Metacritic, which compiles and averages critics' review scores, the film is the 11th worst reviewed film of all time. It also holds a score of 6 out 100 based on reviews from 14 critics, indicating "overwhelming dislike".

Janice Page of the Boston Globe panned the film, and wrote: "Put it this way: National Lampoon's Gold Diggers makes "The Anna Nicole Show" look sophisticated. Page continued "Not only is there nothing thoughtful or interesting about this latest ultra-crass contribution to the Lampoon shelf, there's not even anything very funny." 
Luke Sader of The Hollywood Reporter called it "Cheap-looking, broad and ultimately unnecessary comedy."
Justin Chang of Variety described it as "By turns pointless and pointlessly mean-spirited."

Home media   
An unrated DVD was released in 2005. National Lampoon's Gold Diggers brought in $1.29 million during its first week on the rental market.

References

External links 
 
 
 

2003 films
2003 black comedy films
2003 comedy films
American black comedy films
2000s English-language films
Gold Diggers
2003 directorial debut films
2000s American films